Al-Khalidiyah or Khanik is a village in the al-Hasakah Governorate in northeastern Syria.
The village lies on the Tigris Khabur opposite to the Iraqi village of Faysh Khabur and is located 4 km south of the Semalka Border Crossing and just 3km to the south of the tripoint of Iraq, Syria and Turkey. The village is also famous as the easternmost settlement of Syria.
Khanik is inhabited by Assyrians belonging to the Chaldean Catholic Church and the Assyrian Church of the East. A number of Armenians also live in the village.

See also 
Semalka Border Crossing
Faysh Khabur

References 

Populated places in al-Malikiyah District
Assyrian communities in Syria